Jabr-e Joghrafiyaei (Persian: جبر جغرافیایی) is the second official studio album by the Iranian singer-songwriter Mohsen Namjoo after Toranj. It was officially released sometime in 2008.

Track listing
Ah ke intor
Biaban (The desert)
Buddah
Morghe Sheyda (The bird in love)	
Ey Kash (I wish) 	
Jabre Joghrafiyaei (Geographical determinism, contains an interpolation of Shocking Blue's "Love Buzz", which was also covered by Nirvana)
Shirin 	
Sim e Band (The loudspeakers cable)

References

Mohsen Namjoo albums
2008 albums
Persian music